Benthosema is a genus of lanternfishes.

Species
The currently recognized species in this genus are:
 Benthosema fibulatum (C. H. Gilbert & Cramer, 1897) (spinycheek lanternfish)
 Benthosema glaciale (J. C. H. Reinhardt, 1837) (glacier lantern fish)
 Benthosema panamense (Tåning, 1932) (lamp fish)
 Benthosema pterotum (Alcock, 1890) (skinnycheek lanternfish)
 Benthosema suborbitale (C. H. Gilbert, 1913) (smallfin lanternfish)

References

Myctophidae
Marine fish genera
Taxa named by George Brown Goode
Taxa named by Tarleton Hoffman Bean